Natalya Nikitenko is a member of the parliament of Kyrgyzstan.

References

Year of birth missing (living people)
Place of birth missing (living people)
Living people
Members of the Supreme Council (Kyrgyzstan)
21st-century Kyrgyzstani women politicians
21st-century Kyrgyzstani politicians